This is a list of current National Football League (NFL) franchise post-season and Super Bowl droughts (multiple consecutive seasons of not winning). Listed here are both appearance droughts and winning droughts in almost every level of the NFL playoff system.

All 32 active NFL teams have qualified for and won a game in the playoffs. Teams that have never made it beyond each successive milestone are listed under the year in which they began NFL play.

Of the 12 teams that have never won the Super Bowl, four are expansion franchises younger than the Super Bowl itself (the Bengals, Panthers, Jaguars, and Texans), while the Falcons began playing during the season in which the Super Bowl was first played. The other seven clubs (Cardinals, Lions, Oilers/Titans, Chargers, Browns, Bills, and Vikings) all won an NFL or AFL championship prior to the AFL–NFL merger; in the case of the Vikings, however, the Super Bowl existed at the time they won their only league title (in 1969), leaving them and the Falcons as the only two teams to have never won the highest championship available to them. The longest drought since a championship of any kind is that of the Cardinals, at  seasons.

Note that for continuity purposes, the Cleveland Browns are officially considered to have suspended operations for the 1996, 1997, and 1998 seasons. Since returning  years ago, they have only made the playoffs twice, while the Baltimore Ravens are considered to be a separate team that began play in 1996. The Ravens, as a result of the Cleveland Browns relocation controversy, absorbed the Browns' personnel upon their suspension, but not their history.

Active team droughts

Post-season droughts

Playoff game victory droughts

Sortable table, click on header arrows.

AFC/NFC Championship Game appearance droughts
This is also a list of the last time a particular club won a divisional playoff game.

 The Washington Commanders last appeared in the NFC Championship Game as the Washington Redskins. 
 The Browns were dormant from 1996–1998. Since returning  years ago, the Browns have never played in an AFC Championship Game.
 The Las Vegas Raiders last appeared in the AFC Championship Game as the Oakland Raiders.
 The Los Angeles Chargers last appeared in the AFC Championship Game as the San Diego Chargers.

Super Bowl or NFL championship appearance droughts

 The Browns were dormant from 1996–1998. Since returning  seasons ago, Cleveland has never appeared in a Super Bowl.
 The Washington Commanders last appeared in the Super Bowl as the Washington Redskins.
 The Los Angeles Chargers last appeared in the Super Bowl as the San Diego Chargers. 
 The Las Vegas Raiders last appeared in the Super Bowl as the Oakland Raiders.

Super Bowl or NFL championship win droughts
This list also counts all seasons since a team last won the league championship. Of active NFL teams 20 have won the Super Bowl, Of active NFL teams 7 have won AFL or NFL championship pre-merger Of active NFL teams 5 have not won any championship or Super Bowl.  
 

 Team won as the Chicago Cardinals in 1947.
 Team won as the Houston Oilers in 1961.
 Team won as the San Diego Chargers in 1963.
 Browns suspended operations from 1996–1998. Since returning to the league  years ago, they have never appeared in or won a Super Bowl. 
 Team won Super Bowl XVIII as the Los Angeles Raiders. 
 Team won Super Bowl XXXVI as the Washington Redskins

Super Bowl crown droughts by division

Cities/regions awaiting first Super Bowl crown
Listed according to seasons waited.
Current NFL cities/regions only.

Division title droughts
Listed according to seasons waited.

**Does not include the three seasons (1996–1998) during which the franchise suspended operations.

Historical team droughts

Closest approaches without winning the Super Bowl

Counted from the first Super Bowl season, 1966, to present.

 First round in 1982 playoffs for Minnesota, Cincinnati, Atlanta, Los Angeles Chargers, Arizona, Cleveland, Detroit  
 Second round in 1982 playoffs for Minnesota, Los Angeles Chargers

Longest NFL / AFL / Super Bowl championship droughts through history

This list only shows droughts of 30 or more seasons for teams. A championship is listed as winning an NFL Championship (1920—1969), AFL Championship (1960—1969), and Super Bowl Championship (1966—present). Active droughts are listed in bold type.

Longest NFL / AFL / Super Bowl championship appearance droughts through history

This list only shows droughts of 30 or more seasons for teams. A championship appearance is listed as appearing in an NFL Championship (1932—1969), AFL Championship (1960—1969), or Super Bowl Championship (1966—present). Active droughts are listed in bold type.

Playoff droughts of at least five seasons

Sort by clicking on desired column heading.
Teams grouped together when sorting -
Arizona, Phoenix, St. Louis and Chicago Cardinals  
Indianapolis and Baltimore Colts   
Los Angeles, St. Louis and Cleveland Rams  
Tennessee Titans, Houston Oilers and Tennessee Oilers  
 Las Vegas, Oakland and Los Angeles Raiders  

 In 1944, during World War II, Pittsburgh and the Chicago Cardinals were a combined team called Card-Pitt.
 The Cleveland Rams suspended operations in the 1943 season due to World War II.

Most consecutive post-season losses in team history

This is a sortable table of all 32 current NFL teams. Ten teams have multiple losing streaks where they lost an equal number of post season games before breaking the drought.

Updated through the 2022 season.

Longest post-season droughts in team history

Note that the NFL did not institute a permanent playoff tournament until 1967 and that the NFL Championship Game and any impromptu one-game playoffs (played only in the event of a tie atop the division standings) were the only postseason matchups in this era. The Bert Bell Benefit Bowl (aka the Playoff Bowl; 1960–1969) is considered an exhibition game for the purpose of this list.

Updated through the 2022-23 playoffs

See also
List of NFL franchise post-season streaks
List of current National Football League consecutive playoff appearances
List of last undefeated NFL teams by season

References

Franchise post-season droughts
Franchise post-season droughts
NFL non-appearance
American football records and statistics